Oxyopes lepidus is a species of lynx spider found in India.

References

Oxyopidae
Spiders of the Indian subcontinent
Spiders described in 1864